Lesley Chang is an American architect and designer who co-founded the architecture firm StudioKCA alongside Jason Klimoski. Her designs incorporate sustainable concepts and ecotourism into daily living environments.

Biography 
Chang received her Bachelors of Art degree in architecture from Columbia University. She completed her master's degree in architecture at the Harvard Graduate School of Design. As a student, Chang participated in several design projects working under the German architect James Ingo Freed and his firm Pei Cobb Freed & Partners, as well as Marpillero Pollak Architects  to complete the United States Air Force Memorial in Washington D.C.

Chang has been affiliated with Steven Holl and Gensler, involved with the design of Herning Museum of Contemporary Art in Denmark; HBO Headquarters in New York City; New York Universities Department of Philosophy building, and Tadao Ando's Clark Art Institute.

StudioKCA

Completed projects 
The public architecture installation Head in the Clouds... was completed for the 2013 edition of FIGMENT in Governor's Island Park, New York. It was one of the winners of the American Institute of Architects' Small Projects Awards. The structure is created using the same amount of recycled bottles thrown away in NYC for the duration of an hour: 53,780. With the help of over 200 volunteers, StudioKCA was able to collect the bottles and construct this space. Sand, water jugs, and aluminium provide seating for around 50 people within the pavilion  This design went on to win multiple awards including: 2013 Interior Design Best of Year Award; 2014 Architizer A+ Award Finalist; and 2016 Chicago Athenaeum American Architecture Award.

NASA Orbit Pavilion was located first in New York City for the 2015 World Science Festival before being moved to the Huntington Library, Art Collection, and Botanical Gardens in 2016. The structure resembles the experience of holding a seashell up to ones ear and hearing the sounds of the ocean. Instead of relaying the ocean waves to the audience, the aluminum structure along with surround sound speakers, designed by Shane Myrbeck from Arup SoundLab, relay the noises of NASA satellites in space as they orbit the earth. This chamber received several awards and recognitions including: 2015 Interior Design Best of Year Award Honoree; 2016 Architizer A+ Award Finalist; 2016 AIA Brooklyn Queens Design Merit Award; 2016 SARA New York Design Award of Excellence; 2016 Chicago Athenaeum American Architecture Award; and 2017 New York Design Merit Award.

Working with the nonprofit group Friends of Governors Island in 2017, StudioKCA designed multipurpose mobile information units to bring solar powered, wireless connection to the public in Governors Island as information stations.

The Skyscraper project, otherwise known as The Bruges Whale, was completed in 2018 by StudioKCA with the help of sponsor Triennale Brugge. The 38-foot tall blue whale is composed of over 5 tons of plastic collected from the Pacific Ocean and picked from Hawaiian beaches by StudioKCA, Hawaii Wildlife Fund, and Surfrider Foundation Kaui Chapter.

References

Columbia University alumni
Harvard Graduate School of Design alumni
Year of birth missing (living people)
Living people
21st-century American architects